The Special Rapporteur on the Right to Food is a Special Rapporteur who works for the United Nations and reports on the right to food. The mandate was established in 2000 by the former Commission on Human Rights which appointed the first Rapporteur, Dr. Jean Ziegler. In 2008 the second Rapporteur, Dr. Olivier De Schutter, was appointed by the United Nations Human Rights Council, the successor to the Commission. In 2014 the third Rapporteur, Hilal Elver was appointed. In 2020, the current Rapporteur, Michael Fakhri, was appointed.

Mandate
The Rapporteur is expected to report both to the Human Rights Council and to the UN General Assembly (Third Committee) on the fulfillment of the mandate. The mandate includes: and to promote the full realization of the right to food and the adoption of measures at the national, regional and international levels," "to examine ways and means of overcoming existing and emerging obstacles," continue mainstreaming and taking into account gender and age perspectives, to submit proposals to realise Millennium Development Goal No. 1 to halve by the year 2015 the proportion of people who suffer from hunger, to work in close cooperation with all States, intergovernmental and non-governmental organizations, and the CESCR, and participating in and contributing to relevant conferences.

Country visits
The first Rapporteur engaged in 12 country missions between 2002 and 2007. The second Rapporteur, thus far, engaged in 10 country missions between 2010 and 2012.

References
Citations

Bibliography

.
.
.

See also
 Special rapporteur
 United Nations special rapporteur
 Plant Treaty / UPOV Convention
 Declaration on the Rights of Peasants